Aminoestradiol (AE2), also known as 17β-aminoestradiol (17βAE2) or as 17β-aminoestra-1,3,5(10)-trien-3-ol, is a synthetic, steroidal estrogen and a 17β-aminoestrogen with anticoagulant effects that was never marketed. It is an analogue of estradiol in which the C17β hydroxyl group has been replaced with an amine group. AE2 has profoundly reduced estrogenic potency compared to estradiol; its EC50 for activation of the ERα was found to be 1.82 μM, whereas that of estradiol was 2.14 nM (relative potency 0.12 for AE2 versus 100 for estradiol, or roughly a 1,000-fold difference). It binds with low relative affinity to both the ERα and ERβ and has estrogenic activity that is greatly mediated through the ERβ and to a lesser extent through the ERα.

References

Phenols
Amines
Anticoagulants
Estranes
Synthetic estrogens